Georg Nicolaus Knauer was a German-American Vergilian philologist who was a Professor in the Classics Department of the University of Pennsylvania. He also previously taught at the Freie Universität Berlin from 1954 to 1974  before becoming a Penn professor the following year.  He is best known for Die Aeneis und Homer: Studien zur poetischen Technik Vergils mit Listen der Homerzitate in der Aeneis, published in 1964 by Vandenhoeck & Ruprecht in Göttingen, which is regarded as a comprehensive work on the influence of Homer upon Vergil. That work explains the similarities between the Aeneid and Homer's Iliad and Odyssey, and contains a comprehensive index of similarities between those works.

In 1951, Knauer married his late wife, Elfriede R. "Kezia" Knauer, who  was also a professor emerita at Penn and an expert in the Silk Road working with the Penn Museum before she died in 2010.

References 

University of Pennsylvania faculty
Living people
German classical philologists
Year of birth missing (living people)
University of Pennsylvania Museum of Archaeology and Anthropology